Ghatal Government Polytechnic, established in 2016,  is a government polytechnic located in Konnagarh, Ghatal,  Paschim Medinipur district, West Bengal.

About college
This institute was established and received approval as a Government Polytechnic from AICTE under submission scheme of MHRD awarded to educationally backward district like Paschim Medinipur of West Bengal.

As per order 45-TET (Poly)/4A-08/2003(Pt.) dt. 21/01/2016 from O.S.D & E.O. Deputy Secretary to the Government of West Bengal, DTE & T, the OIC of this institute was authorized to seek approval from AICTE.

Accordingly, possession of land was taken over totallying 5.00 acres of Govt. land at Mouza-Konnagar, J.L. No 147 under P.S. Ghatal in favour of TET Dept, Govt of West Bengal, though the construction agency M/S HSCL already started the construction of the building and completed up to the 1st floor.

The institute applied for approval from AICTE for the session 2016-17 and after scrutiny of the documents of the institute at ERO-AICTE and expert visiting committees physical verification at the campus in March 2016, the approval was received on 30.04.2016 from AICTE, New Delhi.

Initially, the 1st batch of students was admitted and started their classes at the mentor institute as per directives from DTE&T.

Now the institute is operating at its own campus availing all kind of facilities for the students and staff, with some deficiencies.

Education

Library & centers 
In the college there is a library, study facility, language room, common room and seminar hall.

Official Website 
http://polytechnic.wbtetsd.gov.in/ghatalgovpoly

http://ggpoly.in/

See also

References

External links

Universities and colleges in Paschim Medinipur district
Educational institutions established in 2016
2016 establishments in West Bengal
Technical universities and colleges in West Bengal